Tha Byu (c.1778 – 9 September 1840) was the first Karen Christian and a notable evangelist to the Karen.

Biography 
He was born in U Twa village. In his early life, he reportedly engaged in robbery and was involved in many murders.  After being sold as a slave to a Christian Burmese, he was converted to Baptist Christianity by Adoniram Judson in 1828. He was called "Tha Byu" ("younger brother") by Judson when they first met. Judson recalls that Tha Byu was a vicious and angry person when they first met, and Tha Byu confirms this. After his conversion, though, Tha Byu became an energetic missionary to the Karen people. After twelve years, 1,270 Karen had been baptized, with many other believers.

References

Further reading
 
 Ya Ba Toh Loh. Life of Saw Ko Tha Byu (1950)

1778 births
1840 deaths
Burmese people of Karen descent
Converts to Christianity
Burmese Baptist missionaries
Baptist missionaries in Myanmar